T Repaka is a village in Yadadri Bhuvanagiri district in Telangana, India. It falls under Atmakur mandal. It is about 7 km from the nearby town of Mothkur.

Villages in Nalgonda district